The 2010 Lakeside World Professional Darts Championship was the 33rd World Championship organised by the British Darts Organisation, and the 25th staging at the Lakeside Country Club at Frimley Green. Ted Hankey was the defending men's champion having won the title for the second time in the previous year's final against Tony O'Shea. The defending women's champion was Francis Hoenselaar, having beaten seven-time champion Trina Gulliver in the 2009 final.

Players from 32 countries around the globe competed to reach the BBC televised finals, which ran from 2–10 January at Frimley Green. The men's top seed was O'Shea. Julie Gore was top women's seed, ahead of Gulliver. There were 11 debutants at the world championships. Also for the first time two brothers, Tony and Steve West, were playing in the same world championship.

The tournament is also remembered for the first round match between Martin Adams and Anthony Fleet, which featured what has been called "the worst leg of darts ever". The opening leg included visits of 26, 41, 5, 41, 22 and 11 by a visibly nervous Fleet. Adams himself had visits of 47, 44 and 32, but eventually won the 54-dart leg and went on to win the match 3–0. Fleet's match average of 65.34 was the lowest of the championship and described as "pub standard".

Martin Adams was the winner of the men's championship beating unseeded Dave Chisnall 7–5 in the final.  Trina Gulliver won the Women's Championship for the eighth time beating Rhian Edwards 2–0.

Format and qualifiers

Men's
The televised stages featured 32 players. The top 16 players in the WDF/BDO rankings over the 2008/09 season were seeded for the tournament.
An unusually high total of 11 of the seeded players were knocked out in the first round.

The 32 players who qualified for invitation into the first round proper of the men's singles were:

Women's
The televised stages featured 8 players. The top 4 players in the WDF/BDO rankings over the 2008/09 season were seeded for the tournament.

The eight women qualified for invitation were:

Prize money 
The 2010 World Championship had a prize fund of £325,000 - a rise of £5,000 on the previous year.

Men's Champion: £100,000 (up from £95,000)
Runner-up: £30,000
Semi-Finalists (2): £11,000
Quarter-Finalists (4): £6,000
Second Round (8): £4,250
First Round (16): £3,000

Women's Champion: £6,000
Runner-up: £2,000
Semi-Finalists (2): £1,000
Quarter-Finalists (4): £500

Nine dart finish: £52,000
Highest checkout: £3,000

Draw

Men's
 Match distances in sets are quoted in brackets at the top of each round. All sets best of five legs, unless there is a final set tie-break

Women's
 All matches best of three sets, best of five legs

Television coverage 
The tournament has been broadcast by BBC Sport every year since its inception. Having fronted their coverage since 2001, Ray Stubbs did not host their broadcasts in 2010 following his decision to join ESPN the previous summer. He was replaced by BBC Radio 5 Live and Football on Five presenter Colin Murray. Rob Walker, the Master of Ceremonies at BBC's snooker events and host of the BBC's 2009 Winmau World Masters coverage presented the late night highlights and Darts Extra through the night on BBC2. Walker was also the roaming reporter during BBC2's live coverage. Bobby George once again was the pundit.

The commentary team was David Croft, Tony Green and the tournament's number 1 seed Tony O'Shea. Again, every dart was shown live, via the BBC's interactive coverage on its Red Button service – with the semi-finals and final both broadcast live on BBC1/BBC2 on the last weekend.

In Germany the tournament was broadcast by Eurosport. There was no coverage on SBS in the Netherlands, for the first time in several years as they chose to follow the majority of their players who featured in the PDC World Championship instead.

References

External links
 The official site of the Lakeside BDO World Professional Darts Championship

BDO World Darts Championships
BDO World Darts Championship
BDO World Darts Championship
BDO World Darts Championship
Sport in Surrey
Frimley Green